Seyl Gorgi (also Romanized as Seyl Gorgī, Seyl Gorjī, and Sīl Gorjī; also known as Gorgī) is a village in Beyranvand-e Jonubi Rural District, Bayravand District, Khorramabad County, Lorestan Province, Iran. At the 2006 census, its population was 94, in 23 families.

References 

Towns and villages in Khorramabad County